Damián Luna (born 21 February 1985 in Buenos Aires) is an Argentine professional football midfielder.

Career 
On 13 May 2009 the Argentine midfielder has been released by Universidad Católica, upon his request due to personal problems with coach Marco Antonio Figueroa.

References

External links
 
 Argentine Primera statistics  
 BDFA profile 

Living people
1985 births
Footballers from Buenos Aires
Argentine footballers
Argentine expatriate footballers
Association football midfielders
San Lorenzo de Almagro footballers
Club Atlético Independiente footballers
Associação Desportiva São Caetano players
Nueva Chicago footballers
Club Atlético Los Andes footballers
Defensor Sporting players
Ayacucho FC footballers
Argentine Primera División players
Peruvian Primera División players
Uruguayan Primera División players
Expatriate footballers in Brazil
Expatriate footballers in Chile
Expatriate footballers in Uruguay
Expatriate footballers in Peru
Argentine expatriate sportspeople in Brazil